Encentrum is a genus of rotifers belonging to the family Dicranophoridae.

The genus has almost cosmopolitan distribution.

Species:
 Encentrum acrodon Wulfert, 1936 
 Encentrum algente Harring, 1921

References

Ploima
Rotifer genera